Richmond Esker is a national nature reserve of approximately  located near Moylough, County Galway, Ireland. It is managed by the Irish National Parks & Wildlife Service.

Features
Richmond Esker was legally protected as a national nature reserve by the Irish government in 1985.

Richmond Esker, with Timahoe Esker, is one of only a small number of esker ridges that remain in Ireland and that have native woodland. The site has been planted with conifers and other non-native species, but the NPWS have stated the goal of expanding the native woods through management. A review of historical maps of the area concluded that there was a period around 1838 that the area was completely devoid of trees, and that the wood had been re-established by 1892. In 1951 Fagus sylvatica and Larix were planted on the site. Other species recorded on the reserve include Avenula pubescens, Luzula sylvatica,  Poa nemoralis, and Mnium hornum.

References

Geography of County Galway
Forests and woodlands of the Republic of Ireland
Nature reserves in the Republic of Ireland
Tourist attractions in County Galway
Eskers